David García Zubiria (born 14 February 1994) is a Spanish professional footballer who plays for CA Osasuna as a central defender or central midfielder.

Club career
Born in Pamplona, Navarre, García finished joined CA Osasuna's youth setup in 2003, aged nine. He made his senior debut in 2011–12 season with the reserves in the Segunda División B, but appeared more regularly with the Juvenil side.

García was called up to the main squad for the pre-season by manager Jan Urban in the summer of 2014, and scored the last of a 4–0 win against Brentford. He played his first match as a professional on 30 August, starting in the 1–1 Segunda División away draw with Real Zaragoza.

On 26 January 2015, García signed a contract extension with the club running until 2019. He scored his first professional goal on 31 May, his team's last in the 2–0 home victory over Recreativo de Huelva. On 7 June, in the last round of the campaign and with the team needing one point to avoid a second consecutive relegation, he scored in the 78th minute of an eventual 2–2 draw at CE Sabadell FC.

García made his La Liga debut on 19 August 2016, starting in a 1–1 away draw against Málaga CF. He scored his first goal in the competition on 10 September, but in a 5–2 loss at Real Madrid.

On 17 January 2018, García was loaned to Cultural y Deportiva Leonesa of the second division until June.

International career 
On 17 March 2023, García received his first call-up to the Spain national team for the UEFA Euro 2024 qualifying matches against Norway and Scotland.

Career statistics

Honours
Osasuna
Segunda División: 2018–19

References

External links

1994 births
Living people
Spanish footballers
Footballers from Pamplona
Association football defenders
Association football midfielders
Association football utility players
La Liga players
Segunda División players
Segunda División B players
Tercera División players
CA Osasuna B players
CA Osasuna players
Cultural Leonesa footballers